Desulfatiferula berrensis  is a Gram-negative, alkene-degrading, sulfate-reducing and motile bacterium from the genus of Desulfatiferula which has been isolated from oil-polluted sediments from Berre Lagoon in France.

References

External links 

Type strain of Desulfatiferula berrensis at BacDive -  the Bacterial Diversity Metadatabase

Desulfobacterales
Bacteria described in 2014